As of 2022, Hubei hosts 130 institutions of higher education, ranking sixth together with Hunan (130) among all Chinese provinces after Jiangsu (168), Guangdong (160), Henan (156), Shandong (153), and Sichuan (134). The following is List of Universities and Colleges in Hubei.

Public
Huazhong University of Science and Technology (华中科技大学, HUST) 
Wuhan University (武汉大学, WHU) 
Wuhan University of Technology (武汉理工大学, WUT) 
China University of Geosciences, CUG) 
Central China Agricultural University (华中农业大学, HAU /HZAU Huazhong Agricultural University) 
Central China Normal University (华中师范大学, CCNU Huazhong Normal University) 
Zhongnan University of Economics and Law (中南财经政法大学, ZUEL) 
South-Central University for Nationalities()

Wuhan
Hubei University
Wuhan University of Science and Technology
Wuhan Textile University
Wuhan Institute of Technology
Wuhan University of Science and Engineering
Wuhan Polytechnic University
Hubei University of Technology
Hubei College of Traditional Chinese Medicine
Wuhan Institute of Physical Education
Hubei Institute of Fine Arts
Jianghan University
Hubei University of Police
Wuhan Conservatory of Music
Hubei University of Economic
Hubei University of Education
Wuhan Vocational College of Software and Engineering
 Wuhan Technical College of Communications

Xiangyang
Hubei University of Arts and Science

Jingzhou
Yangtze University

Enshi
Hubei University for Nationalities
yangtze university

Xiaogan
Hubei Engineering University

Yichang
China Three Gorges University

Shiyan
Hubei University of Medicine
Hubei University of Automotive Technology
Hubei Industrial Polytechnic
Hanjiang Normal University

Huanggang
Huanggang Normal University

Huangshi
Hubei Institute of Technology
Hubei Normal University

Jingmen
Jingchu University of Technology

Xianning
Hubei University of Science and Technology

References

List of Chinese Higher Education Institutions — Ministry of Education
List of Chinese universities, including official links
Hubei Institutions Admitting International Students

 
Hubei